Non-linear inverse Compton scattering (NICS), also known as non-linear Compton scattering and multiphoton Compton scattering, is the scattering of multiple low-energy photons, given by an intense electromagnetic field, in a high-energy photon (X-ray or gamma ray) during the interaction with a charged particle, in many cases an electron. This process is an inverted variant of Compton scattering since, contrary to it, the charged particle transfers its energy to the outgoing high-energy photon instead of receiving energy from an incoming high-energy photon. Furthermore, differently from Compton scattering, this process is explicitly non-linear because the conditions for multiphoton absorption by the charged particle are reached in the presence of a very intense electromagnetic field, for example, the one produced by high-intensity lasers.

Non-linear inverse Compton scattering is a scattering process belonging to the category of light-matter interaction phenomena. The absorption of multiple photons of the electromagnetic field by the charged particle causes the consequent emission of an X-ray or a gamma ray with energy comparable or higher with respect to the charged particle rest energy.  

The normalized vector potential  helps to isolate the regime in which non-linear inverse Compton scattering occurs ( is the electron charge,  is the electron mass,  the speed of light and  the vector potential). If , the emission phenomenon can be reduced to the scattering of a single photon by an electron, which is the case of inverse Compton scattering. While, if , NICS occurs and the probability amplitudes of emission have non-linear dependencies on the field. For this reason, in the description of non-linear inverse Compton scattering,  is called classical non-linearity parameter.

History 
The physical process of non-linear inverse Compton scattering has been first introduced theoretically in different scientific articles starting from 1964. Before this date, some seminal works had emerged dealing with the description of the classical limit of NICS, called non-linear Thomson scattering or multiphoton Thomson scattering. In 1964, different papers  were published on the topic of electron scattering in intense electromagnetic fields by L. S. Brown and T. W. B. Kibble, and by A. I. Nikishov and V. I. Ritus, among the others. The development of the high-intensity laser systems required to study the phenomenon has motivated the continuous advancements in the theoretical and experimental studies of NICS. At the time of the first theoretical studies, the terms non-linear (inverse) Compton scattering and multiphoton Compton scattering were not in use yet and they progressively emerged in later works. The case of an electron scattering off high-energy photons in the field of a monochromatic background plane wave with either circular or linear polarization was one of the most studied topics at the beginning. Then, some groups have studied more complicated non-linear inverse Compton scattering scenario, considering complex electromagnetic fields of finite spatial and temporal extension, typical of laser pulses.

The advent of laser amplification techniques and in particular of chirped pulse amplification (CPA) has allowed to reach sufficiently high-laser intensities to study new regimes of light-matter interaction and to significantly observe non-linear inverse Compton scattering and its peculiar effects. Non-linear Thomson scattering was first observed in 1983 with  keV electron beam colliding with a Q-switched Nd:YAG laser delivering an intensity of  W/cm2, photons of frequency two times the one of the laser were produced, then in 1995 with a CPA laser of peak intensity around  W/cm2 interacting with neon gas, and in 1998 in the interaction of a mode-locked Nd:YAG laser ( W/cm2) with plasma electrons from a helium gas jet, producing multiple harmonics of the laser frequency. NICS was detected for the first time in a pioneering experiment  at the SLAC National Accelerator Laboratory at Stanford University, USA. In this experiment, the collision of an ultra-relativistic electron beam, with energy of about  GeV, with a terawatt Nd:glass laser, with an intensity of  W/cm2, produced NICS photons which were observed indirectly via a nonlinear energy shift in the spectrum of electrons in output; consequent positron generation was also observed in this experiment. 

Multiple experiments have been then performed by crossing a high-energy laser pulse with a relativistic electron beam from a conventional linear electron accelerator, but a further achievement in the study of non-linear inverse Compton scattering has been achieved with the realization of all-optical setups. In these cases, a laser pulse is both responsible for the electron acceleration, through the mechanisms of plasma acceleration, and for the non-linear inverse Compton scattering occurring in the interaction of accelerated electrons with a laser pulse (possibly counter-propagating with respect to electrons). Research is still ongoing and active in this field as attested by the numerous theoretical and experimental publications.

Classical limit 
The classical limit of non-linear inverse Compton scattering, also called non-linear Thomson scattering and multiphoton Thomson scattering, is a special case of classical synchrotron emission driven by the force exerted on a charged particle by intense electric and magnetic fields. Practically, a moving charge emits electromagnetic radiation while experiencing the Lorentz force induced by the presence of these electromagnetic fields. The calculation of the emitted spectrum in this classical case is based on the solution of the Lorentz equation for the particle and the substitution of the corresponding particle trajectory in the Liénard-Wiechert fields. In the following, the considered charged particles will be electrons, and gaussian units will be used.

The component of the Lorentz force perpendicular to the particle velocity is the component responsible for the local radial acceleration and thus of the relevant part of the radiation emission by a relativistic electron of charge , mass  and velocity . This equation defines a simple dependence of the local radius of curvature on the particle velocity and on the electromagnetic fields felt by the particle. Thus, the power distribution in frequency of non-linear Thomson scattering by a relativistic charged particle can be seen as equivalent to the general case of synchrotron emission with the main parameters made explicitly dependent on the particle velocity and on the electromagnetic fields.

Electron quantum parameter 
Increasing the intensity of the electromagnetic field and the particle velocity, the emission of photons with energy comparable to the electron one becomes more probable and non-linear inverse Compton scattering  starts to progressively differ from the classical limit because of quantum effects such as photon recoil. A dimensionless parameter, called electron quantum parameter, can be introduced to describe how far the physical condition are from the classical limit and how much non-linear and quantum effects matter. This parameter is given by the following expression:where  V/m is the Schwinger field. In scientific literature,  is also called . The presence of such a strong field implies the instability of vacuum and it is necessary to explore non-linear QED effects , such as the production of pairs from vacuum. The Schwinger field corresponds to an intensity of nearly  W/cm2. The electron quantum parameter is linked to the magnitude of the Lorentz four-force acting on the particle due to the electromagnetic field and it is a Lorentz-invariant:The four-force acting on the particle is equal to the derivative of the four-momentum with respect to proper time. The electron quantum parameter increases with the energy of the electron (direct proportionality to ) and it is larger when the force exerted by the field perpendicularly to the particle velocity increases.

Plane wave case 
Considering a plane wave the electron quantum parameter can be rewritten using this relation between electric and magnetic fields:where  is the wavevector of the plane wave and  the wavevector magnitude. Inserting this expression in the formula of :where the vectorial identity  was used. Elaborating the expression:Since  for a plane wave and the last two terms under the square root compensate each other,  reduces to:

In the simplified configuration of a plane wave impinging on the electron, higher values of the electron quantum parameter are obtained when the plane wave is counter-propagating with respect to the electron velocity.

Quantum effects 
A full description of non-linear inverse Compton scattering must include some effects related to the quantization of light and matter. The principal ones are listed below.

 Inclusion of the discretization of the emitted radiation, i.e. the introduction of photons with respect to the continuous description of the classical limit. This effect does not change quantitatively the emission features but changes how the emitted radiation is interpreted.
where  stands for the McDonald functions. Consequently, a large Lorentz factor and intense fields increase the chance of producing high-energy photons.  goes as  because of this formula.

 The effect of radiation reaction, due to photon recoil.  The electron energy after the interaction process reduces because part of it is delivered to the emitted photon and the maximum energy achievable by the emitted photon cannot be higher than the electron kinetic energy. This effect is not taken into account in non-linear Thomson scattering in which the electron energy is supposed to remain almost unaltered in energy such as in elastic scattering. Quantum radiation reaction effects become important when the emitted photon energy approaches the electron energy. Since  ,  if  the classical limit of NICS is a valid description, while for  the energy of the emitted photon is of the order of the electron energy and photon recoil is very relevant.

 The quantization of the motion of the electron and spin effects. An accurate description of non-linear inverse Compton scattering is made considering the electron dynamics described with the Dirac equation in presence of an electromagnetic field.

Emission description when  and   

When the incoming field is very intense , the interaction of the electron with the electromagnetic field is completely equivalent to the interaction of the electron with multiple photons, with no need of explicitly quantize the electromagnetic field of the incoming low-energy radiation. While the interaction with the radiation field, i.e. the emitted photon, is treated with perturbation theory: the probability of photon emission is evaluated considering the transition between the states of the electron in presence of the electromagnetic field. This problem has been solved primarily in the case in which electric and magnetic fields are orthogonal and equal in magnitude (crossed field); in particular, the case of a plane electromagnetic wave has been considered. Crossed fields represent in good approximation many existing fields so the found solution can be considered quite general.
For  it reduces to the classical spectrum. Note that if  ( or ) the spectrum must be zero because the energy of the emitted photon cannot be higher than the electron energy, in particular could not be higher than the electron kinetic energy .

This expression is equal to the classical one if  is equal to one and it can be expanded in two limiting cases, near the classical limit and when quantum effects are of major importance:A related quantity is the rate of photon emission:where it is made explicit that the integration is limited by the condition that if  no photons can be produced. This rate of photon emission depends explicitly on electron quantum parameter and on the Lorentz factor for the electron.

Applications 
In the case of electrons, this means that it is possible to produce photons with MeV energy that can consequently trigger other phenomena such as pair production, Breit–Wheeler pair production, Compton scattering, nuclear reactions.

In the context of laser-plasma acceleration, both relativistic electrons and laser pulses of ultra-high intensity can be present, setting favourable conditions for the observation and the exploitation of non-linear inverse Compton scattering for high-energy photon production, for diagnostic of electron motion, and for probing non-linear quantum effects and non-linear QED. Because of this reason, several numerical tools have been introduced to study non-linear inverse Compton scattering. For example, particle-in-cell codes for the study of laser-plasma acceleration have been developed with the capabilities of simulating non-linear inverse Compton scattering with Monte Carlo methods. These tools are used to explore the different regimes of NICS in the context of laser-plasma interaction.

See also 

 Compton scattering
 Synchrotron radiation
 Breit–Wheeler process
 Quantum electrodynamics
 Laser

References

External links 

 High-energy photon emission & radiation reaction in the PIC code SMILEI - Example of particle-in-cell code with a module for NICS simulation.
 CORELS research - Example of research activity on NICS.

Scattering
Quantum electrodynamics